Territory is Ronnie Montrose's second album of instrumental jazz fusion music although there are vocals on "Love You To" and "I Spy".

Track listing
"Catscan" (Ronnie Montrose) - 5:04
"I'm Gonna Be Strong" (Barry Mann, Cynthia Weil) - 2:53
"Love You To" (George Harrison) - 4:43
"Odd Man Out" (Montrose)- 3:53
"I Spy" (Montrose) - 4:20
"Territory" (Montrose) - 4:28
"Synestesia" (Montrose) - 3:26
"Pentagon" (Montrose) - 3:58
"Women of Ireland" (Seán Ó Riada) - 5:37

Personnel
Ronnie Montrose – guitar, mandolin, bass guitar, keyboards, koto, Steiner head, vocals on "Love You To"
Hilary Hanes - bass guitar
Steve Bellino - drums
John Hanes - drums
Andre B. Chapman - drums
Patrick Feehan - keyboards
Mitchell Froom - keyboards
Kevin Monaghan - keyboards
Doug Morton - keyboards
Edgar Winter - saxophone on "Catscan"
Barbara Imhoff - harp on "Women of Ireland"
Michael Beese - electric violin
Keeta Bill - vocals on "I Spy"

Production
Produced by Ronnie Montrose
Engineered by Roger Wiersema and Ronnie Montrose 
Cover artwork by Marc Bonilla and Paul Bonilla

References
Ronnie Montrose; "Territory" liner notes; Passport Records 1986
All Music Guide []

1986 albums
Ronnie Montrose albums
Passport Records albums